(28 February 1926 – 10 August 2018) was a Japanese actress. She won the award for best supporting actress at the 9th Hochi Film Award for The Funeral. Sugai is famous for her role as Sen Nakamura in the jidaigeki drama Hissatsu series.

She won the Best Supporting Actress award at the 8th Japan Academy Film Prize for her role in The Funeral. In 2008, she landed lead role for the first time in Hideo Sakai film "Bokuno Obaachan" at the age of 82, and was certified as Guinness as "the world's oldest movie starring actress".

Filmography
Film

Television
Hissatsu series
Hissatsu Shiokinin (1973) as Sen Nakamura
Kurayami Shitomenin (1974) as Sen Nakamura
Hissatsu Shiokiya Kagyō (1975–1976) as Sen Nakamura
Shin Hissatsu Shiokinin (1977) as Sen Nakamura
Edo Professional Hissatsu Shōbainin (1978) as Sen Nakamura
Hissatsu Shigotonin (1979–1981) as Sen Nakamura
Shin Hissatsu Shigotonin (1981–1982) as Sen Nakamura
Hissatsu Shigotonin III (1982–1983) as Sen Nakamura
Hissatsu Shigotonin V Gekitouhen (1985–1986) as Sen Nakamura
Hissatsu Shigotonin V Senpuhen (1986–1987) as Sen Nakamura
Hissatsu Shigotonin V Fuunryūkohen (1987) as Sen Nakamura
Hissatsu Shigotonin Gekitotsu (1991–1992) as Sen Nakamura
Taiyo ni Hoero! (1973–1974) as Taki Shibata
The Water Margin (1973)
Uchi no Ko ni Kagitte... (1985) Teacher Aramaki
Kōmyō ga Tsuji (2006) as Naka

Honours
Medal with Purple Ribbon (1990)
Order of the Precious Crown, 4th Class, Wisteria (1996)

References

1926 births
2018 deaths
Actresses from Tokyo
Recipients of the Medal with Purple Ribbon